Autosensitization dermatitis presents with the development of widespread dermatitis or dermatitis distant from a local inflammatory focus, a process referred to as autoeczematization.

See also
 Id reaction
 List of cutaneous conditions

References

External links 

Eczema